Owen Murphy may refer to:
 Owen Murphy (politician), Canadian politician
 Owen Murphy (baseball), American baseball player

See also
 Eoghan Murphy, Irish politician
 Eoghan Murphy (hurler), Irish hurler
 Eoin Murphy (disambiguation)